Reddish Vale High School, formerly Reddish Vale Technology College is a secondary school in Stockport, Greater Manchester, England. It is a coeducational school with academy status, part of South Manchester academy trust, educating 1100 pupils in the 11-16 range.

Description

The school facilities include a sports hall, gym, astro turf pitch, tennis courts, purpose built performing arts block, library, farm and swimming pool. The school also offers specialist classrooms in the areas of cooking and nutrition, art and design, performing arts, science and computing.

It has been awarded the Artsmark Gold Award from the Arts Council of England.  A 2006 OFSTED report summarized it as "a good school".

The school achieved its best GCSE results in the summers of 2016 and 2017; becoming the most improved school in Stockport in 2016.

Governance
Reddish Vale became a specialist Technology College in 1995, being one of the first LEA schools in the country to do so. It was the first school in the United Kingdom to adopt the Co-operative College's co-operative -based model for trust school governance in 2007. Within a year, a further 25 schools adopted the model as one offering strong values and extensive engagement of all stakeholders within the learning community.

Staff
The current Deputy Headteachers are Ms Carolyn Forsyth and Mrs Claire Evans. The current Headteacher is Mrs Linda Hanson.

References

External links
 Reddish Vale High School website
 Reddish Vale's 2006 Ofsted report

Secondary schools in the Metropolitan Borough of Stockport
Academies in the Metropolitan Borough of Stockport